Friendship Park is a  passive park located off Glenwild Avenue in Bloomingdale, New Jersey. It contains trails and creates opportunities for passive recreation in a natural, woodland setting. A limited number of picnic tables are located along the trails of this park. The NY and NJ Trail Conference has marked several trails with yellow, orange, red, and blue markers in 2012 to guide hikers.

References

External links
 Friendship Park - NY and NJ Trail Conference
 Friendship Park Details - Passaic County, NJ

Bloomingdale, New Jersey
Parks in Passaic County, New Jersey
County parks in New Jersey